Elbeuf-sur-Andelle (literally Elbeuf on Andelle) is a commune in the Seine-Maritime department in the Normandy region in north-western France.

Geography

Population

Places of interest
 The church of St.Peter & Paul, dating from the nineteenth century.
 A watermill by the Héronchelles river, where it joins the Andelle.
 The chapel of Notre-Dame.

See also
Communes of the Seine-Maritime department

References

Communes of Seine-Maritime